Karl Manne Georg Siegbahn FRS(For) HFRSE (3 December 1886 – 26 September 1978) was a Swedish physicist who was awarded the Nobel Prize in Physics in 1924 "for his discoveries and research in the field of X-ray spectroscopy".

Biography
Siegbahn was born in Örebro, Sweden, the son of Georg Siegbahn and his wife, Emma Zetterberg.

He graduated in Stockholm 1906 and began his studies at Lund University in the same year. During his education he was secretarial assistant to Johannes Rydberg. In 1908 he studied at the University of Göttingen. He obtained his doctorate (PhD) at the Lund University in 1911, his thesis was titled Magnetische Feldmessungen (magnetic field measurements). He became acting professor for Rydberg when his (Rydberg's) health was failing, and succeeded him as full professor in 1920. However, in 1922 he left Lund for a professorship at Uppsala University.

In 1937, Siegbahn was appointed Director of the Physics Department of the Nobel Institute of the Royal Swedish Academy of Sciences. In 1988 this was renamed the Manne Siegbahn Institute (MSI). The institute research groups have been reorganized since, but the name lives on in the Manne Siegbahn Laboratory hosted by Stockholm University.

X-ray spectroscopy 
Manne Siegbahn began his studies of X-ray spectroscopy in 1914. Initially he used the same type of spectrometer as Henry Moseley had done for finding the relationship between the wavelength of some elements and their place at the periodic system. Shortly thereafter he developed improved experimental apparatus which allowed him to make very accurate measurements of the X-ray wavelengths produced by atoms of different elements. Also, he found that several of the spectral lines that Moseley had discovered consisted of more components. By studying these components and improving the spectrometer, Siegbahn got an almost complete understanding of the electron shell. He developed a convention for naming the different spectral lines that are characteristic to elements in X-ray spectroscopy, the Siegbahn notation. Siegbahn's precision measurements drove many developments in quantum theory and atomic physics.

Awards and honours
Siegbahn was awarded the Nobel Prize in Physics in 1924. He won the Hughes Medal 1934 and Rumford Medal 1940. In 1944, he patented the Siegbahn pump. Siegbahn was elected a Foreign Member of the Royal Society in 1954.

Personal life
Siegbahn married Karin Högbom in 1914. They had two children: Bo Siegbahn (1915–2008), a diplomat and politician, and Kai Siegbahn (1918–2007), a physicist who received the Nobel Prize in Physics in 1981 for his contribution to the development of X-ray photoelectron spectroscopy.

Awards and decorations
   Commander Grand Cross of the Order of the Polar Star (6 June 1947)
  Nobel Prize in Physics (1924)
  Hughes Medal (1934)
  Rumford Medal (1940)

Works 

 The Spectroscopy of X-Rays (1925)

References

External links

  including the Nobel Lecture, December 11, 1925 The X-ray Spectra and the Structure of the Atoms

1886 births
1978 deaths
20th-century Swedish physicists
People from Örebro
Experimental physicists
Lund University alumni
Nobel laureates in Physics
Swedish Nobel laureates
Academic staff of Uppsala University
Members of the French Academy of Sciences
Foreign Members of the Royal Society
Foreign Members of the USSR Academy of Sciences
Spectroscopists
Amanuenses
Commanders Grand Cross of the Order of the Polar Star
Presidents of the International Union of Pure and Applied Physics
Members of the Royal Society of Sciences in Uppsala